A babysitter is one who temporarily cares for a child.

Babysitter(s) or babysitting may also refer to:

Film
Babysitter, a 2015 film by Morgan Krantz which screened at the 2015 Deauville American Film Festival
Babysitter (2022 film), a 2022 Canadian film by Monia Chorki
Babysitting (film), a 2014 French film
The Babysitter (1995 film), a 1995 film starring Alicia Silverstone
The Babysitters, a 2007 film starring Katherine Waterston
The Babysitter, an alternate title for the 1975 European film Wanted: Babysitter
The Babysitter (1980 film), an American TV movie starring William Shatner
The Babysitter (2017 film), an American horror film starring Judah Lewis and Samara Weaving

Television
 "The Babysitters", a 1970 episode of The Brady Bunch
 "Babysitting" (Beavis and Butt-head episode), a 1996 episode
 "The Babysitter" (Cow and Chicken), a 1998 episode
 "The Babysitter" (Frasier episode), a 2003 episode
 Babysitter (TV series), a 2016 South Korean drama series

Music
The Baby Sitters (folk group), a children's music group that started in 1958 and included member Alan Arkin
Baby Huey & the Babysitters, an American music group founded in 1963
Babysitter, a song by American rapper DaBaby

Other uses
The Babysitter (novel series), by R. L. Stine initially published from 1989 to 1995
The Babysitter, a nickname for the Oakland County Child Killer

See also

The Baby-Sitters Club, a series of novels written by Ann M. Martin
Adventures in Babysitting (1987 film)
Adventures in Babysitting (2016 film)

Baby (disambiguation)
Sitter (disambiguation)